Step Up 3D (also known as Step Up 3) is a 2010 American 3D dance film directed by Jon M. Chu and written by Amy Andelson and Emily Meyer.  It serves as a sequel to 2008's Step Up 2: The Streets and the third installment in the Step Up film series. The film sees the return of Adam G. Sevani and Alyson Stoner, who portrayed Moose from Step Up 2: The Streets and Camille Gage from Step Up, respectively. It also stars Rick Malambri and Sharni Vinson.

The film follows Moose and Camille Gage as they head to New York University, the former dancer of whom is majoring in electrical engineering after promising his father that he would not dance anymore. However, he soon stumbles upon a dance battle, meeting Luke Katcher and his House of Pirates dance crew and later teaming up with them to compete in the World Jam dance contest against their rival, the House of Samurai dance crew.

Step Up 3D premiered in Hollywood at the El Capitan Theater on August 2, 2010, and was subsequently released in the United States on August 6, 2010, by Walt Disney Studios Motion Pictures, through conventional 2D and 3D formats. It was the second movie to feature the Dolby Surround 7.1 audio format theatrically, preceded by Toy Story 3. The film grossed $15.8 million in its opening weekend, the lowest opening of the first three films in the series, but went on to become the biggest box office of the series, grossing $159.2 million. It received mixed reviews from critics, with most praise towards its dance sequences and effective use of 3D, while criticism went towards the repetitive story and acting.

A sequel, Step Up Revolution, was released on July 27, 2012.

Plot 
In New York City, Moose and Camille attend the New York University. Moose is majoring in electrical engineering after promising his father that he would not dance anymore. While touring the campus, he sees a pair of Limited Edition Gun Metal Nike Dunks worn by Luke Katcher, the leader of the House of Pirates dance crew. Moose follows the shoes and then stumbles upon a dance battle, where he beats Kid Darkness from the dancing crew House of Samurai. Luke takes him back to his place, an old warehouse converted into a club, to try to convince Moose to join his dance crew, with whom he teams up. Luke believes that with the skills of Moose and the rest of his crew dancers that they could win the $100,000 grand prize in the World Jam Championships contest to solve financial problems. After all, he is five months behind in the mortgage payments and the warehouse could be put for auction at any second, if they are not paid.

Luke meets Natalie at the club and notices her dancing abilities, enlisting her to become part of his crew, but is unaware of Natalie's motives. Moose has to choose between his studies and dance, between a test and a dance competition. He goes to test, but seeing the paper and receiving a message from Luke, he rushes to the competition just in time.

Luke and Natalie become close as the movie progresses. Luke explains his true intentions with his recordings and dance interviews. Natalie is hiding the fact that her brother is Julien, the leader of the House of Samurai, and lies about everything but the love connection between her and Luke.

Natalie faces a hard decision between her love and her family. She confronts Luke and asks what happened with him and Julien. He says that Julien was a member of the House of Pirates, but has a gambling problem and he once wagered against the Pirates and threw the battle, so the Pirates kicked him out. After arguing with Julien, she decides to leave Luke rather than betray him further. Julien uses her phone to invite Luke for her birthday party. Luke asks Moose to attend the party with him, but because they have no invitation, they are not permitted to enter. They find a way to get in and Luke and Natalie dance a tango. Julien reveals Natalie's identity and Luke is angry with Natalie. When Luke arrives back at the warehouse, he finds it is foreclosed. Angry at himself for not being a better leader, he exclaims that the House of Pirates is over, and the crew members go their separate ways. Moose and Camille are best friends, but Moose does not see that Camille is in love with him. The two fall out after Moose shows up late to a party; the final straw after being distant with her since arriving at university.

Moose and Camille make up in the streets by dancing as Fred Astaire and Ginger Rogers to a remix of "I Won't Dance". Camille tells Moose that he can never give up dancing as he was born to do it. Moose helps out Luke by bringing the House of Pirates back together, and giving him additional members for his crew including Camille and The MSA Crew from the previous film. They discover that one of the former members are now performing with the House of Samurai and they were told by the former crewmate that Julien has bought their warehouse, but says if they throw the battle, they can have it back, but they do not take the offer.

Natalie helps Luke and the Pirates win the World Jam with the routine they had practiced. She invites him to come with her to California, which he does by meeting her at the train station and kissing her just as Moose kisses Camille. Before leaving, Luke gives Moose the pair of Limited Edition Gun Metal Nike Dunks while the movie ends.

Cast 
 Rick Malambri as Luke Katcher, the leader of the House of Pirates.
 Adam G. Sevani as Robert "Moose" Alexander III, a hip hop dancer who is studying electrical engineering at NYU.
 Sharni Vinson as Natalie, a talented street dancer who is recruited to join the House of Pirates.
 Alyson Stoner as Camille Gage, Moose's best friend and Tyler's foster sister who is a talented hip hop dancer.
 Joe Slaughter as Julien, the leader of the House of Samurai and Natalie's brother.
 Frank Moran as Moose's Dad
 Keith Stallworth as Jacob
 Kendra Andrews as Anala
 Stephen "tWitch" Boss as Jason Hardlerson
 Chadd "Madd Chadd" Smith as Vladd
 Jonathan "Legacy" Perez as Legz
 Martín Lombard as Martin Santiago
 Facundo Lombard as Marcos Santiago
 Oren "Flearock" Michaeli as Carlos, A person in the House of Pirates
 Daniel "Cloud" Campos as Kid Darkness
 Shirley Henriquez, as part of the pirates crew 
 Luis Alberto Rodríguez, as part of the Pirates crew
 Carolina Ravassa as Kristen
 Alberto Collado Aracena, as part of the pirates crew
 Jose Hernandez
 Glenn Michael A. Mataro, as part of the pirates crew
 Tamara Levinson, as Bend
 The MSA Crew
 Christopher Scott as Hair
 Harry Shum Jr. as Cable
 Janelle Cambridge as Fly 
 LaJon Dantzler as Smiles
 Luis Rosado as Monster
 Mari Koda as Jenny Kido 
 Levi Rivers as Spinner
 Danielle Polanco as Missy 
 The Lil Pirates
 Jalen Testermen
 Angelo "Lil Demon" Baligad
 Simrin C Player
 Jose BoyBoi Tena

Soundtrack

Step Up 3D is the film soundtrack album from the motion picture Step Up 3D. The album was released on 27 July 2010. The singles from the album are: "Club Can't Handle Me" by Flo Rida featuring David Guetta, "Already Taken" by Trey Songz, "My Own Step" by Roscoe Dash and T-Pain featuring Fabo and "Irresistible" by Wisin & Yandel.
"Squeeze It (feat. Dada Life & Tiesto)" by DJ Frank E was used in the official advertisement of the film.

Home media
The film was released by Touchstone Home Entertainment on Blu-ray 3D and DVD in the United Kingdom on November 29, 2010, in the United States on December 21, 2010, and in the Philippines on January 27, 2011.

Reception

Critical response
 
Step Up 3D received mixed reviews from critics. Review aggregator Rotten Tomatoes gave it an approval rating of 46% based on 123 reviews, with an average score of 5.10/10. The website's critical consensus said: "It may not contain believable acting or a memorable plot, but Step Up 3-D delivers solid choreography and stunning visuals". It holds a score of 45 out of 100 on Metacritic from 23 reviews, indicating "mixed or average reviews". Audiences polled by CinemaScore gave the film a grade B+.

Keith Uhlich of Time Out New York named Step Up 3D the third-best film of 2010, arguing that it "[one-upped] the overpraised stereoscopic advancements of Avatar." In 2020, Uhlich named it the tenth-best film of the 2010s.

Box office 
The film made $6,657,326 on its first night of release (August 6, 2010), landing second after the buddy cop film The Other Guys, which received $13,124,233. In the weekend box office the movie placed third with $15,812,311 behind the latter and Inception. Its domestic box-office run ended on November 4, 2010, having accumulated $42,400,223 and as of December 5, 2010 it has also earned $116,889,135 in other territories, for a worldwide total of $159,289,358. It has more than doubled the overseas gross of the first film, although it is the least-grossing film of the series in the United States and Canada. On the weekend lasting from October 8–10, 2010 it surpassed Step Up 2: The Streets to become the highest-grossing movie of the franchise worldwide. In terms of estimated attendance, it is far behind its predecessors. Besides the United States and Canada, countries where it grossed over $10 million were Germany ($13,869,503), Russia and the CIS ($12,131,409) and the United Kingdom, Ireland and Malta ($11,537,610).

Accolades 
Melissa Muik, the film's music editor, was nominated for a 2011 Golden Reel Award for Best Sound Editing – Music in a Musical Feature Film.

References

External links 
 
 
 

2010 films
2010s English-language films
Step Up (film series)
2010 romantic drama films
American 3D films
American teen drama films
American teen romance films
American dance films
American musical drama films
American romantic drama films
American romantic musical films
Films about dance competitions
Films set in New York City
Films shot in New York City
2010s hip hop films
American sequel films
Summit Entertainment films
Touchstone Pictures films
2010 3D films
Films directed by Jon M. Chu
Films scored by Bear McCreary
2010s American films